Songs is the ninth studio album by American R&B/soul singer-songwriter Luther Vandross. It was released by Epic Records on September 20, 1994. The album, a collection of cover versions, produced the singles "Endless Love", "Always and Forever", and "Ain't No Stoppin' Us Now". According to an interview both Vandross and Mariah Carey gave in Japan following the release of their duet "Endless Love", there was mention that Carey had given advice as to what songs Vandross would cover on this album.

Songs earned Vandross four nominations at the 1995 Grammy Awards for Best Male Pop Vocal Performance for "Love the One You're With", Best Pop Collaboration with Vocals for "Endless Love", Best Male R&B Vocal Performance for "Always and Forever", and Best R&B Album.

Track listing

Personnel 
 Luther Vandross – lead and backing vocals, BGV arrangements (1, 7, 10)
 Walter Afanasieff – arrangements (1, 3, 4, 5, 10-13), keyboards (1, 3, 4, 6-13), synthesizers (1-4, 6, 7, 8, 10-13), Hammond B3 organ (1, 5, 8, 9, 10), bass guitar (1), drums (1), percussion (1), rhythm programming (1, 3, 4, 6-13), acoustic piano (2), Synclavier (2, 3, 4, 6, 11, 12, 13), acoustic guitar (2, 3, 4, 6, 11, 12, 13), Moog bass (3, 4, 6, 7, 8, 10-13), drum programming (3, 4, 6-13), additional programming (5), synth horns (10)
 Gary Cirimelli – digital programming, Macintosh programming, synthesizer programming 
 Ren Klyce – digital programming, synthesizer programming 
 Dan Shea – keyboards (2, 5, 6-10), synthesizers (2, 5, 8, 9), Moog bass (2, 5, 9), drum programming (2, 9), rhythm programming (2, 5, 9), arrangements (2, 6-9), programming (6, 8, 10)
 Dann Huff – guitar, nylon guitar solo (3)
 Michael Landau – additional guitar (2, 5, 7, 11)
 Michael Thompson – additional guitar (8)
 Stephen "Doc" Kupka – baritone saxophone (9)
 Emilio Castillo – tenor saxophone (9)
 David Mann – tenor saxophone (9)
 Lee Thornburg – trombone (9), trumpet (9), flugelhorn (9)
 Greg Adams – trumpet (9), flugelhorn (9), horn arrangements (9)
 Jeremy Lubbock – orchestra arrangements and conductor (3, 4, 6, 9, 11, 12, 13)
 Isobel Griffiths – orchestra contractor (3, 4, 6, 9, 11, 12, 13)
 The London Symphony Orchestra – orchestra (3, 4, 6, 9, 11, 12, 13)
 Narada Michael Walden – original arrangements (11)
 Tawatha Agee – backing vocals (1, 2, 5, 7, 9, 10, 13)
 Johnny Britt – backing vocals (1, 7, 8, 9, 11)
 Alexandra Brown – backing vocals (1, 7, 9, 11)
 Lynn Davis – backing vocals (1, 7, 9, 11)
 Jim Gilstrap – backing vocals (1, 7, 8, 9, 11)
 Phillip Ingram – backing vocals (1, 7, 8, 9, 11)
 Paulette McWilliams – backing vocals (1, 2, 5, 7, 9, 10, 13)
 Phil Perry – backing vocals (1, 7, 8, 9, 11)
 Brenda White-King – backing vocals (1, 5)
 Lisa Fischer – backing vocals (2, 5)
 Mariah Carey – lead vocals (3)
 Robin Clark – backing vocals (7, 9, 13)
 Cindy Mizelle – backing vocals (7, 9, 10)
 Fonzi Thornton – backing vocals (7, 9)
 Claytoven Richardson – backing vocals (8)
 Cissy Houston – backing vocals (10, 13), BGV arrangements (10)
 Darlene Love – backing vocals (10)
 Phillip Ballou – backing vocals (13)
 Kevin Owens – backing vocals (13)

Production 
 Walter Afanasieff – producer 
 Luther Vandross – co-producer
 Dana Jon Chappelle – engineer, recording, mixing (1, 5, 7, 8, 10, 12)
 Mick Guzauski – mixing (2, 3, 4, 6, 9, 11, 13)
 Paul Brown – vocal recording (Luther Vandross)
 Jay Healy – vocal recording (Mariah Carey)
 Hadyn Bendall – strings recording
 Kyle Bess – assistant engineer
 Gus Garces – assistant engineer
 David Gleeson – assistant engineer
 Bill Leonard – assistant engineer 
 Chris Ludwinski – assistant engineer
 Kent Matcke – assistant engineer
 Gil Morales – assistant engineer
 Mike Reiter – assistant engineer
 David Reitzas – assistant engineer
 Mike Scott – assistant engineer
 Andy Smith – assistant engineer
 Bob Ludwig – mastering 
 Marsha Burns – production coordinator 
 Barbara Stout – production coordinator
Studios 
 Mixed at The Hit Factory, Right Track Recording and Sony Music Studios (New York, NY); The Plant Studios (Sausalito, CA).
 Mastered at Gateway Mastering (Portland, ME).

Charts

Weekly charts

Year-end charts

Certifications

References

1994 albums
Luther Vandross albums
Albums produced by Luther Vandross
Albums produced by Walter Afanasieff
Covers albums
Epic Records albums